Sea Salts is a 1949 animated short film featuring Donald Duck.  It was released by Walt Disney Productions.

Plot
'Mac' Bootle Beetle tells the story of the time he and Donald Duck were sole survivors of a shipwreck. The story involves how Donald cheats Mac out of food, both on the raft and the deserted island they land on.  Eventually they were rescued and became life-long friends.

Voice cast
Clarence Nash as Donald Duck
Dink Trout as "Mac" Bootle Beetle

Home media
The short was released on December 11, 2007, on Walt Disney Treasures: The Chronological Donald, Volume Three: 1947-1950.

References

External links
 
 

1949 films
1949 animated films
1940s Disney animated short films
Donald Duck short films
Films produced by Walt Disney
Films scored by Oliver Wallace